The 1945–46 season was the 46th season in the history of Berner Sport Club Young Boys. The team played their home games at Stadion Wankdorf in Bern.

Players
 Maurice Glur
 Hans Flühmann
 Louis Gobet
 Albert Stoll
 Ernst Giacometti
 Eugène Walaschek
 Fritz Knecht
 Hans Blaser
 Walter Streun
 Hans Trachsel
 Klossner

Friendlies

Competitions

Overall record

Nationalliga A

League table

Matches

Swiss Cup

References

BSC Young Boys seasons
Swiss football clubs 1945–46 season